Thiers (Auvergnat: Tièrn) is a commune in the Puy-de-Dôme department of Auvergne in central France. With Ambert, Issoire and Riom, it is one of the department's four sub-prefectures. The district of Thiers consists of forty-three municipalities in six cantons. Its inhabitants are known as Thiernois or Bitords.

Thiers is a major historical centre of knife manufacturing, with about one hundred companies and a cutlery museum; seventy percent of French pocketknives, kitchen and table knives are manufactured in Thiers. The knowledge and craft of the Thiernois cutlers are over seven centuries old, and many of the old watermills that were used to manufacture Thiernois knives can still be seen in the Vallée des Rouets.

It is divided into two sections: the lower city (home to many hypermarkets) and the upper, medieval city.

Overview

Neighborhoods

Thiers is on the steep hills overlooking the Durolle Valley, and the gradient provides hydropower for grinding mills. The city is divided into a number of neighborhoods. The upper town includes the medieval center, Boulay, the Pontel and the Jaiffours. Much of the city's history took place in its hills.

The lower city began to be developed during the 1950s. Thiers is known as a city of hypermarkets and supermarkets, and the lower city primarily consists of businesses and services.

Le Moutier, a prosperous neighborhood, is between the lower city and the city center. The doors of the church of Saint-Symphorien depict the mouth of hell and the plants of the nearby valleys. Many knife manufacturers are in the neighborhood.

Hazards

Thiers is vulnerable to natural disasters. The north of the city experienced two landslides in 1984: one along the A89 autoroute and the other in the Valley of the Mills. Earthquakes may also occur in Thiers, which is classified as a Zone 3 Seismic Area (moderate seismicity). The city, which on the Dore and Durolle Rivers and a number of streams, has a history of flooding.

In addition to natural hazards, the city is exposed to human-created risks. The  Membrun Dam, on the Durolle, is a kilometre from the city's outskirts. In 1999, the mountain overlooking the city was the target of arsonists who set fire to the forest near the Margerides cliff.

Environment

Parks and gardens
Verdun Square, on Rue Grammont, has a monument commemorating French efforts during World War I. Les Jardins de Saint-Jean are between the old Thiers hospital and the Durolle River. Le Breuil Park is a former campsite; locker rooms, showers, and camp toilets are still visible at the bottom of the park. The Chassaigne Castle features an English landscape garden.

A local fair is held during the third week of September in a park between the Orangerie Park and Le Breuil Park. There is a small green area opposite the Gare de Thiers (Thiers Station).

Protected areas
Natural areas surrounding Thiers are the Limagne plain in the west; the Dore valley, largely classified and protected by the Natura 2000 network; the Livradois-Forez Regional Natural Park, and the Auvergne volcanoes beyond the Limagne plain.

Urban renewal
Thiers began an urban renewal project in 2002, rehabilitating Antonin Chastel Place, the San Juan district and the Transvaal streets.

Population
In 2019, Thiers had a population of 11,784 inhabitants. The first peak in population was reached in 1901, at 17,625. The population began a downward trend until the end of World War II, when it began climbing again to a second peak of 16,623 in 1968.

History

Antiquity 
Thiers is at the eastern end of the Roman road linking it to Lezoux. The road was part of the old national road 89, which has become Departmental Road 2089 and Secondary Road 62.

Middle Ages 
The town was settled during the 10th century, when Malfred (granddaughter of the count of Auvergne) ordered the construction of a castle and church which became Église Saint-Genès de Thiers. In 1371, the Barony of Thiers passed to the Lords and then the Dukes of Bourbon.

French Revolution 
The repression of counterrevolutionary activities in Thiers began in June 1791, after Louis XVI's flight to Varennes, intensifying in February 1793 against the clergy and triggering a wave of emigration which lasted until 1815. Although the Revolutionary Supervisory Committee was created on 22 May 1793, the committee was not very active; its prison opened in September. Forty-nine people were arrested in Thiers, primarily those involved in the revolts of Vollore-Ville and Servant, in October 1793.

World War II 
Thiers was one of the few towns, and the only one in the Puy-de-Dôme, which was freed by arms on 25 August 1944. The fighting opposed the 400-strong SS Panzergrenadiers Training Battalion 18, which was sent to France on 22 June 1944 and reached Vichy on 29 June. The troops were divided among Thiers, Randan, Saint-Yorre, Le Mayet-de-Montagne, the Francs-Tireurs et Partisans (FTP) of the 103rd FFI battalion (led by Major André Rossignol, known as "Pigeon") and the 104th Battalion of Major Roger Beligat (alias "Alain Derval"). The mayor, appointed by the Vichy regime, and the sub-prefect were intermediaries between the FFI and the German troops.

Economy
Thiers is known for its cutlery, and a museum in the old quarter exhibits the history of knife-making. Further along the valley, the industrial-heritage museum l'Usine du May, opened in 2009. Factories include Forges Gorce, who make blades for agricultural machinery from hedge trimmers to combine harvesters.

Tourism 
Thiers has seven hotels, six guest rooms, three gîtes, and three campsites. A tourist office is at the foot of the half-timbered castle of Pirou in the town center.

Museums 
The Cutlery Museum has permanent and temporary exhibits and demonstrations of the work of cutlers. Le Creux de l'enfer is a center of contemporary art, with national and international programming.

Entertainment 
Le Métro is a concert hall dedicated to contemporary music. The Moulin bleu is a cabaret. The three-screen Monaco Cinema has a varied program, and the local cinema club presents a film every month. Thiers was featured in François Truffaut's 1976 film, Small Change. It is the birthplace of journalist Claire Chazal and actor Zinedine Soualem.

Festivals 
The annual Pamparina music festival has been held on the town streets during the first weekend in July since 1997. The international festival attracted over 45,000 people in 2016 and 2017. Each spring since 1991, the Coutellia knife festival has more than 100 exhibitors from around the world. The festival features demonstrations and friendly competition. A Christmas market has been held at three locations in the town center each December since 2012.

Leisure and sports 
Thiers has three stadiums: the Antonin Chastel stadium in the lower town; the Gravels stadium in the upper town, and a stadium in the leisure centre of Iloa. The  centre, Auvergne's largest, is part of the Natura 2000 network and the Livradois-Forez Regional Natural Park.

Sister cities
Thiers has been a sister city of Bridgnorth, England since 1978 and Schrobenhausen, Germany since 1986.

Gallery

See also
Laguiole knife
Marjacq knife
Communes of the Puy-de-Dôme department

References

External links

Auvergne
Communes of Puy-de-Dôme
Subprefectures in France